Gromia appendiculariae is a unicellular, and parasitic, organism in the genus Gromia, which closely resembles Gromia sphaerica.

A specimen of G. appendiculariae was discovered as a parasite attached to the tail of a species of Oikopleura.

References 

Gromiidea
Amoeboids
Parasitic eukaryotes
Parasites of animals